Marcus Joel Borg (March 11, 1942 – January 21, 2015) was an American New Testament scholar and theologian. He was among the most widely known and influential voices in Liberal Christianity. Borg was a fellow of the Jesus Seminar and a major figure in historical Jesus scholarship. He retired as Hundere Distinguished Professor of Religion and Culture at Oregon State University in 2007. He died eight years later at the age of 72, of idiopathic pulmonary fibrosis at his home in Powell Butte, Oregon.

Early life and education
Borg was born March 11, 1942, in Fergus Falls, Minnesota, and raised in a Lutheran family in North Dakota. After high school he attended Concordia College in Moorhead, Minnesota, where he double-majored in political science and philosophy. Though plagued by doubt as a young adult, after his undergraduate studies Borg accepted a Rockefeller Brothers Theological Fellowship to study at Union Theological Seminary in New York City, where he became familiarized with liberal theology. A profound influence on Borg during his seminary years was the theologian W. D. Davies. After his studies at Union, he matriculated at Mansfield College, Oxford, where he earned both his Master of Theology and Doctor of Philosophy degrees.

Career
Borg taught at Concordia College in Moorhead, Minnesota, from 1966 to 1969 and 1972 to 1974; South Dakota State University in Brookings from 1975 to 1976; and Carleton College in Northfield, Minnesota, from 1976 to 1979. He was a faculty member at Oregon State University from 1979 until his retirement in 2007 as Distinguished Professor in Religion and Culture and the Hundere Endowed Chair in Religious Studies. Borg was appointed Chair of the Religious Studies Department in January 1988. The Religious Studies Department was closed at the end of the 1991–1992 academic year and Borg became a faculty member in the Philosophy Department. During his time at Oregon State he organized and led two nationally televised symposia, one in 1996 (Jesus at 2000), and another in 2000 (God at 2000). Borg also served as Visiting Professor of New Testament at the Pacific School of Religion, Berkeley (1989–1991) and the Chism Distinguished Visiting Professor at the University of Puget Sound, Tacoma, Washington (1986–1987).

Borg served as national chair of the Historical Jesus Section of the Society of Biblical Literature, co-chair of its International New Testament Program Committee and president of the Anglican Association of Biblical Scholars. On May 31, 2009, he was installed as the first canon theologian at Trinity Episcopal Cathedral, Portland, Oregon.

Borg frequently collaborated with his friend John Dominic Crossan. He was a friend of N. T. Wright since their days together at Oxford, despite having theological differences. The two discussed those differences in their book The Meaning of Jesus: Two Visions (1999, rev. 2007). Borg was often featured in programs on networks such as PBS, NPR and National Geographic, and appeared on ABC World News and The Today Show. In 2001, he debated William Lane Craig over the resurrection of Jesus. Borg also debated New Testament scholar Craig Blomberg and evangelical apologist James White on topics such as the historical reliability of the gospels and the historical Jesus.

Borg died on January 21, 2015, in Powell Butte, Oregon.

Works

Books

 - based on the author's thesis

 - (published in the UK as Convictions: A Manifesto for Progressive Christians)

Edited by

Chapters

References

External links
Marcus J. Borg Foundation
Borg's Blog for the Washington Post

American Episcopalians
American people of Swedish descent
Anglican biblical scholars
Anglican pacifists
New Testament scholars
Oregon State University faculty
Writers from Minnesota
Writers from North Dakota
1942 births
2015 deaths
People from Fergus Falls, Minnesota
Concordia College (Moorhead, Minnesota) alumni
Union Theological Seminary (New York City) alumni
Alumni of Mansfield College, Oxford
Deaths from pulmonary fibrosis
Members of the Jesus Seminar
Christian bloggers
American biblical scholars
People from Powell Butte, Oregon
20th-century biblical scholars
20th-century Christian biblical scholars
Concordia College (Moorhead, Minnesota) faculty